See Deori (disambiguation) for disambiguation

Deori is a census town in Shahdol district  in the state of Madhya Pradesh, India.

Geography
It has an average elevation of 360 metres (1181 feet).

Demographics
 India census, Deori had a population of 5761. Males constitute 53% of the population and females 47%. Deori has an average literacy rate of 68%, higher than the national average of 59.5%: male literacy is 77% and, female literacy is 57%. In Deori, 14% of the population is under 6 years of age.

References

Cities and towns in Shahdol district
Shahdol